HMS Offa was an O-class destroyer of the Royal Navy which entered service in 1941 and was scrapped in 1959.

Service history

Second World War service
During November 1941 Offa was part of the escort of Convoy PQ 4, the fifth of the Arctic Convoys of the Second World War. The convoy sailed from Hvalfjord, Iceland on 17 November 1941 and arrived at Arkhangelsk on 28 November 1941.

On 14 September 1942 Offa (Lt.Cdr.

She took part in the King's Birthday celebrations at Kiel on 2 June 1945 together with HMS Obedient

Postwar service

In 1946 Offa served as a target ship for submarines, until being placed in reserve at Devonport in February 1948. In April 1948 she was refitted at Devonport and on 30 November 1949 she was transferred to Pakistan and renamed Tariq.

She was returned to the Royal Navy at Portsmouth in July 1959. She was then scrapped, arriving at Sunderland on 13 October 1959.

Notes

References
 
 
 
 
 
 
 
 

 

O and P-class destroyers
Ships built in Govan
1941 ships
World War II destroyers of the United Kingdom
O-class destroyers of the Pakistan Navy